Jacopo Pietro Murano (born 14 February 1990) is an Italian professional footballer who plays as a striker for  club Potenza on loan from Avellino.

Career
On 17 January 2019, he was released from his contract with SPAL by mutual consent.

On 22 February 2019, he joined Serie C club Potenza. He has previously helped the club get promoted in the 2013–14 season from the fifth-tier Eccellenza to Serie D by scoring 37 goals in the league  (with 5 additional in Coppa Italia).

On 17 September 2020 he signed with Perugia.

On 22 January 2022 he joined Avellino. On 26 January 2023, Murano returned to Potenza on loan.

References

External links

1991 births
Living people
People from Potenza
Sportspeople from the Province of Potenza
Footballers from Basilicata
Italian footballers
Association football forwards
Serie B players
Serie C players
Lega Pro Seconda Divisione players
Serie D players
Eccellenza players
S.S.D. Città di Campobasso players
Taranto F.C. 1927 players
A.S.D. Victor San Marino players
A.C. Montichiari players
S.S.D. Città di Brindisi players
Potenza Calcio players
S.S. Monopoli 1966 players
F.C. Grosseto S.S.D. players
U.S.D. Recanatese 1923 players
Savona F.B.C. players
S.P.A.L. players
Trapani Calcio players
A.C. Perugia Calcio players
U.S. Avellino 1912 players